San Francisco Day School, referred to as SFDS or SF Day, is a co-educational independent day school of about 400 students from kindergarten through 8th grade in San Francisco, California. The school opened in 1981.  The current and interim Head of School is Peter McCormack who joined in January, 2022.

The school recently completed a campus expansion which has a theatre, art room, music room, rooftop garden, and housing for teachers. This expansion also includes a renovated outdoor space.

The site used to be the Carew & English Mortuary

References

External links
School website

Private elementary schools in California
Private middle schools in California